Brandon E. Presley (born July 21, 1977) is an American politician who has served as a member of the Mississippi Public Service Commission from the Northern District since 2008. A member of the Democratic Party, Presley previously served as the mayor of Nettleton, Mississippi, from 2001 to 2007.

Early life 
Brandon Presley was born on July 21, 1977 in Amory, Mississippi and raised in Nettleton. His father was an alcoholic and died when Brandon was eight years old, leaving him in the sole care of his mother. His uncle, Harold Ray Presley, subsequently served as a father figure for him. He studied at Itawamba Community College and Mississippi State University.

Political career

Early activities 
Presley described his politics as "Populist, FDR-Billy McCoy Democrat." He managed the successful campaign of his uncle Harold for the office of Sheriff of Lee County when he was 16 years old. 

Presley ran for the office of Mayor of Nettleton in 2001 and won with 78 percent of the vote. He was sworn-in as the mayor in July 2001. Aged 23 upon his assumption of the office, he was the youngest mayor in Mississippi's history. He served until 2007. As mayor, he crossed party lines to endorse the reelection campaign of George W. Bush in 2004.

Public Service Commissioner 
On June 15, 2007, Presley declared his campaign for the office of Public Service Commissioner for the Northern District of the Mississippi Public Service Commission. He defeated two other candidates in the August Democratic primary and defeated Republican Mabel Murphree in the general election. He was re-elected in 2011, 2015, and 2019.

Presley assumed office as Public Service Commissioner for the Northern District on January 1, 2008. During his first year in office he advocated streaming the commission's meetings on the internet. He has advocated bringing internet access to rural areas of Mississippi. 

Presley opposed the Kemper Project, a large Mississippi Power "clean coal" electricity plant development in Kemper County, as residents in the Northern District were not served by Mississippi Power or would otherwise economically benefit from the project. The project suffered from delays and cost overruns. In 2017, Presley became chairman of the Public Service Commission, which then forced Mississippi Power to terminate its plans for clean coal electricity generation at the Kemper facility.

Presley, as well as the other two members of the Public Service Commission, opposes using Mississippi as an alternative site to Yucca Mountain for nuclear waste storage.

In 2014, Presley succeeded Betsy Wergin of Minnesota to serve as chair of the National Association of Regulatory Utility Commissioners’ Committee on Consumer Affairs. The committee is charged with analyzing the role that state service commissions play in consumer protection within the energy and telecommunications industries. 

In the 2015 elections, Democratic State Representative Cecil Brown was elected to represent the Central District. This gave the Democratic Party a majority on the Commission. Subsequently Presley was appointed to serve as chair of the commission. In March, he presided over the groundbreaking of the largest solar power facility in the state. The project is a joint effort between the PSC, the United States Navy and Mississippi Power at NCBC Gulfport.

2023 gubernatorial campaign
Following months of speculation, Presley announced his candidacy for Governor of Mississippi in the 2023 election on January 12, 2023. Later that month he delivered a response to incumbent Governor Tate Reeves' State of the State address, advocating for the state to embrace Medicaid expansion and accusing Reeves' of allowing rural hospitals to close. On February 16 the Mississippi Democratic Party's executive committee voted to disqualify two minor candidates for the party's gubernatorial nomination for failing to follow ethics disclosures, leaving Presley the only qualified candidate in the Democratic primary.

Personal life
Presley is a second cousin of Elvis Presley. He lost  during 2013 and 2014.

References

Works cited

External links
 

1977 births
21st-century American politicians
Itawamba Community College alumni
Living people
Mayors of places in Mississippi
Mississippi Democrats
Mississippi State University alumni
People from Amory, Mississippi
People from Nettleton, Mississippi
Presley family